Saint-Paul-d'Oueil (Gascon: Sent Pau d'Oelh) is a commune in the Haute-Garonne department in southwestern France.

Geography

Climate

Saint-Paul-d'Oueil has a oceanic climate (Köppen climate classification Cfb).

Population

Sights
The Château de Saint-Paul-d'Oueil is a 16th-century castle which is listed as a historic site by the French Ministry of Culture.

See also
Communes of the Haute-Garonne department

References

Communes of Haute-Garonne